Jacewo  is a village in the administrative district of Gmina Inowrocław, within Inowrocław County, Kuyavian-Pomeranian Voivodeship, in north-central Poland.

As of the census of 2011, the village had population of 569.

References

Jacewo